Yulia Lavrenchuk (born May 24, 1978) is a Ukrainian former competitive figure skater. She is the 1997 European bronze medalist, the 1998 Nations Cup silver medalist, and a two-time (1995, 1997) Ukrainian national champion. Her highest World placement was 9th, in 1997 and 1999. She finished 11th at the 1998 Winter Olympics in Nagano.

Programs

Results
GP: Champions Series/Grand Prix

References

External links
 Figure skating corner profile

Ukrainian female single skaters
Living people
Olympic figure skaters of Ukraine
Figure skaters at the 1998 Winter Olympics
Sportspeople from Kyiv
1978 births
European Figure Skating Championships medalists